Dodgeland High School is a public school located in Juneau, Wisconsin. It forms part of the Dodgeland School District. It's mascot is the Wally.

References

External links
School district website

Public high schools in Wisconsin
Schools in Dodge County, Wisconsin
Public middle schools in Wisconsin